Fermín Sanz-Orrio y Sanz (14 July 1901 – 29 November 1998) was a Spanish politician who served as Minister of Labour of Spain between 1957 and 1962, during the Francoist dictatorship.

References

1901 births
1998 deaths
Labour ministers of Spain
Government ministers during the Francoist dictatorship